</ref>

Gameplay was similar to the 1973–79 version, featuring two full games, each with two new contestants. Each game is self-contained, with two questions per contestant; the winner advances to the Super Match. If the score was tied after two rounds, a tiebreaker round with all stars was played; if the tie persisted, a sudden-death tiebreaker was played. Values for the audience match portion of the bonus game were $5,000, $3,000, and $2,000, with $1,000 awarded for not matching any of the top three answers. The contestant then selected a celebrity for the head-to-head match, which multiplied the audience match winnings by five if successful, for a potential top prize of $25,000.

On many episodes, answers deemed inappropriate for broadcast were edited out with comical effects, including a slide whistle sound effect dubbed over the audible answer in place of the usual bleep censor. In addition, the answer card and celebrity's mouth could be blurred or pixelated.

The show was picked up to fill ABC's winter programming schedule on January 4, 2017.

On April 2, 2017, the show began to be used as a mid-season replacement on Sunday evenings with newly produced episodes filling in for three weeks to replace the canceled period drama/sci-fi series Time After Time before the start of May sweeps, when extended season finales and awards ceremonies fill out the remainder of the season.

On August 6, 2017, ABC announced that Match Game was renewed for a third season, which later premiered on January 9, 2018. Season four of the show debuted in June 2019. On November 20, 2019, the series was renewed for a fifth season, which premiered on May 31, 2020. After the last series of episodes aired over summer 2020 and July 2021, ABC confirmed in April 2022 that the series had been cancelled; the decision was made before Baldwin fatally shot a crew member on the set of the film Rust in October 2021.

Episode status
Only 11 episodes of the 1962–69 series are known to survive—the pilot and 10 kinescope recordings, all of which are archived at the Paley Center for Media. Nine of these are black-and-white kinescopes and one is a color episode (from 1969 and on videotape). The pilot has since fallen into the public domain.

Reruns
The 1973–82 incarnations are shown in reruns daily on Buzzr and GSN.

Virtually all episodes of this version are still extant, although some are reportedly not shown due to celebrities' refusals of clearances and others have been banned for various reasons (usually for answers from either celebrities or contestants that are now deemed to no longer be politically correct). Some episodes no longer air on GSN because old videocassettes were damaged. The 1990–91 ABC version has also had runs on GSN, most recently from 2002 to 2004. On December 25, 2012, an episode of the 1998 version along with a Bert Convy pilot aired on GSN for the first time as part of a Match Game marathon.

Buzzr also airs reruns of the 1970's Match Game incarnation. Buzzr added the Match Game-Hollywood Squares Hour episodes to its lineup in February 2019, initially with the first week of episodes; more episodes were eventually added in September after the network updated the show's archive for 21st-century broadcasting standards. Those episodes had not been seen on television since their original broadcasts.

The Real Match Game Story: Behind the Blank
On November 26, 2006, GSN aired an hour-long documentary titled The Real Match Game Story: Behind The Blank, narrated by Jamie Farr. The documentary features rarely seen footage of the 1960s version, many odd or memorable moments from the main 1973–82 runs, and interviews with Rayburn (including the final interview before his death in 1999), Somers, Dawson, DeBartolo, producer Ira Skutch, and others involved in the show's production.

Music
Match Game featured several theme songs throughout its various runs. From 1962 to 1967, Bert Kaempfert's instrumental "A Swingin' Safari" was used as the theme. Kaempfert's commercial single, recorded in Europe, was used for the pilot; an American cover version by the Billy Vaughn orchestra was used through 1967. From 1967 to 1969, a new theme composed by Score Productions was used.

When the program returned in 1973, Goodson–Todman once again turned to Score Productions for a music package. A new theme, performed by The Midnight Four, was composed by Score staff composer Ken Bichel with a memorable "funk" guitar intro, and similar elements and instruments from this theme were also featured in the numerous "think cues" heard when the panel wrote down their answers. Alternate think cues were extracted from the music packages for Tattletales and The Money Maze. In keeping with the zany atmosphere, the music supervisors also used other notable musical works to add to humorous situations. Among the non-Score Productions music heard on occasion was the "burlesque" music titled "The Stripper", and a version of "Stars and Stripes Forever" (usually humorously played in response to Rayburn's call for "belly dancing" music).

The music for The Match Game–Hollywood Squares Hour was composed by Edd Kalehoff. None of the music used from the 1970s version was used in this version. The main theme song and several of its cue variations were used on The Price Is Right.

In 1990, Bichel re-orchestrated his 1970s theme with more modern instruments with new think cues (with the classic intro/think cue re-orchestrated). The 1998 version again used music from Score Productions. The 2016 revival utilizes Bichel's original 1973 theme and think cues.

International versions

Merchandise

Home games
Several home game versions based on the 1960s and 1970s American television version were published by Milton Bradley from 1963 through 1978, in multiple editions.

The Match Game (1963–69)
Starting in 1963, Milton Bradley made six editions of the NBC version. Each game contained crayons, wipe-off papers, 100 perforated cards with six questions per card, a plastic scoreboard tray with colored pegs and chips, and 6 "scribble boards". After the first edition, the vinyl scribble boards and crayons were replaced with six "magic slates" and wooden styli.

The main object of the game is for a contestant to try to write answers to questions that will match the answers of his or her partner. The rules for a six-contestant game are the same as on the TV show (with similar scoring, such as receiving points for matching two answers and more points for matching all three answers), but the home game also has variations for fewer than six contestants. No bonus game is included.

Milton Bradley also created a Fine Edition and a Collector's Edition with more questions. The magic slates came enclosed in a gold folder, plus a dial to keep score instead of the pegboard. The scoring and point values were just like the TV show. The only difference between the Fine Edition and the Collector's Edition is that instead of being packaged in a normal cardboard box, it came in a leatherette case with buttons on the front apron.

Match Game (1974–78)
Starting in 1974, Milton Bradley created three more editions based on the most famous CBS version. Each edition contained a game board with a plastic stand, two game booklets (one with instructions) with material for 92 complete games (368 Main Game Questions and 92 audience match and head-to-head match questions), two magic slates and styli (only of the head-to-head match portion), and play money.

As in the 1970s version, two contestants have two chances to match as many of the six celebrities as possible. Celebrity answers are printed in the booklets, and after the contestant gives an answer, the M.C. reads the celebrity responses one by one, marking correct answers on the game board. A contestant can get up to six matches in one game. The contestant with the most matches plays the Super Match round (the MC reads the question and the responses) for a chance to win money (with an audience match and a head-to-head match similar to the TV show) of up to $5,000.

Interactive online versions
After much success with its online version of Family Feud, Uproar.com released a single-contestant version of Match Game in 2001. However, as of September 30, 2006, the website has been temporarily shut down, no longer offering any game show-based games of any kind.

GSN offered a version called Match Game: Interactive on its own website that allowed users to play along with the show while watching. However, as of January 1, 2007, only those shows airing between 7:00pm and 10:00pm were interactive as Match Game itself was not one of them.

Slot machine
A five reels video slot machine based on the 1973–82 version was released at various US casinos by WMS Gaming in 2004. The game features caricatures of Jimmie Walker, Brett Somers, Charles Nelson Reilly, Morgan Fairchild (even though she has never appeared on any incarnations of the show itself), Rip Taylor and Vicki Lawrence as the panel and Gene Rayburn as the host. The slot machine's bonus round stays faithful to the original game format where round one is adapted from the main game while round two features the Super Match bonus round.

Home media
A DVD set called The Best of Match Game featuring a collection of more than 30 episodes of the 1970s version including the original 1962 pilot episode (which was originally called The Match Game) was released in 2006. An eight-episode collection, called "The Best of Match Game: Dumb Dora Is So Dumb Edition!", was released later on in 2007 by BCI Eclipse Company LLC (under license from FremantleMedia Enterprises), which contained 8 original episodes, uncut and unedited, and digitally restored, re-mastered and transferred from the original 2-inch videotape recording masters for optimum video quality.

In 2007, Endless Games released a DVD game featuring questions and clips from the 1970s version. Its gameplay was similar to that of the 1970s version; however, it allowed up to six contestants rather than two. Scoring for the game was also slightly different as well, as every match in round one was worth $50 each while in round two, every match was worth $100. Also, the Super Match round was played differently. The audience match portion was played after round one by the leading contestants, and the head-to-head match by the winning contestants, with a correct match doubling the winnings of the contestant's scores.

References

External links
 1962 pilot episode at archive.org
 
 
 
 
 
 
 
 
 
 
 
 
 
 

1960s American comedy game shows
1962 American television series debuts
1969 American television series endings
1970s American comedy game shows
1973 American television series debuts
1982 American television series endings
1980s American comedy game shows
1990s American comedy game shows
2010s American comedy game shows
2020s American comedy game shows
1990 American television series debuts
1991 American television series endings
1998 American television series debuts
1999 American television series endings
2016 American television series debuts
2021 American television series endings
2010s Canadian game shows
2012 Canadian television series debuts
American Broadcasting Company original programming
American television series revived after cancellation
CBS original programming
CTV Comedy Channel original programming
First-run syndicated television programs in the United States
NBC original programming
Panel games
Television series by Mark Goodson-Bill Todman Productions
Television series by Fremantle (company)
Television shows filmed in Montreal
Television shows filmed in Toronto